George Edward Yankowski (November 19, 1922 – February 25, 2020) was an American professional baseball player. He was born in Cambridge, Massachusetts, and attended Watertown High School in Watertown, MA. Yankowski played parts of two seasons in Major League Baseball, appearing in six games for the Philadelphia Athletics during the 1942 season and twelve games for the Chicago White Sox in 1946, primarily as a catcher. 

Yankowski served in the United States Army as a sniper during World War II, including fighting in the Battle of the Bulge and became a recipient of the Bronze Star Medal and the Combat Infantryman Badge. He died on February 25, 2020, at the age of 97.

References

External links

1922 births
2020 deaths
Sportspeople from Cambridge, Massachusetts
Military personnel from Massachusetts
Major League Baseball catchers
Philadelphia Athletics players
Chicago White Sox players
Fall River Indians players
Muskegon Clippers players
Memphis Chickasaws players
Baseball players from Massachusetts
Northeastern University alumni
United States Army personnel of World War II
Snipers